Renfrow is a surname of Scottish origin, and a variant of Renfrew. Notable people with the surname include:

Hunter Renfrow (born 1995), American football player
Justin Renfrow (born 1989), American football player
Randy Renfrow (born 1958), American racecar driver
William Cary Renfrow (1845–1922), American soldier

See also
Renfro (surname)
Renfroe, surname

References

Surnames of Scottish origin